Yüreğil may refer to the following places in Turkey:

 Yüreğil, Bucak
 Yüreğil, Dazkırı, a village in the district of Dazkırı, Afyonkarahisar Province
 Yüreğil, Emirdağ, a village in the district of Emirdağ, Afyonkarahisar Province